Asylum may refer to:

Types of asylum 
 Asylum (antiquity), places of refuge in ancient Greece and Rome
 Benevolent Asylum, a 19th-century Australian institution for housing the destitute
 Cities of Refuge, places of refuge in ancient Judea
 Church asylum or sanctuary, a right to be safe from arrest in the sanctuary of a church or temple
 Lunatic asylum or mental asylum, a historical term for psychiatric hospital
 Orphan asylum, orphanage
 Right of asylum, political asylum

Entertainment

Fiction 
 Asylum (comics), a comic series
 Asylum (Darvill-Evans novel), a 2001 Doctor Who novel
 Asylum (McGrath novel), a 1996 novel by Patrick McGrath
 Asylum (series), a young adult horror series
 Asylums (book), a 1961 nonfiction book by Erving Goffman

Film 
 Asylum (1972 horror film), a horror film starring Peter Cushing
 Asylum (1972 documentary film), a film featuring the psychiatrist R. D. Laing
 Asylum (2003 film), an American short documentary
 Asylum (2005 film), a British drama by David Mackenzie based on the novel by Patrick McGrath
 Asylum (2008 film), an American horror film by David R. Ellis
 Asylum (2014 film), an American horror film

Television 
 Asylum (1996 TV series), a UK comedy series on Paramount Comedy Channel
 Asylum (2015 TV series), a UK comedy series on the BBC
 "Asylum" (Law & Order), an episode of Law & Order
 "Asylum" (Moon Knight), an episode of Moon Knight
 "Asylum" (Person of Interest), an episode of Person of Interest
 "Asylum" (Sliders), an episode of Sliders
 "Asylum" (Supernatural), an episode of Supernatural
 "Asylum" (Torchwood), a 2009 episode of Torchwood
 American Horror Story: Asylum, the second season of American Horror Story

Albums 
 Asylum (The Back Horn album), 2010
 Asylum (Disturbed album), 2010
 Asylum (Kiss album), 1985
 Asylum (The Legendary Pink Dots album), 1985

Songs 
 "Asylum" (The Orb song), 1997
 "Asylum", by Disturbed from Asylum
 "Asylum", by John Legend from Love in the Future
 "Asylum", by Alanis Morissette from Flavors of Entanglement (non-album track)
 "Asylum", by Gary Numan from The Pleasure Principle
 "Asylum", by Onslaught from In Search of Sanity
 "Asylum", by Slaughterhouse, featuring Eminem, from Welcome to: Our House
 "Asylum", by Supertramp from Crime of the Century

Other
 Asylum Township, Bradford County, Pennsylvania, U.S.
 Asylum (magazine), a magazine about mental health and psychiatry
 Asylum Records, an American record label
 Asylum (1981 video game), an adventure game
 Asylum (upcoming video game), a horror game in development since 2010
 The Asylum, an American film production company known for their mockbusters.
 Weekend at the Asylum, a large annual steampunk event held in Lincoln, England

See also 
 Asylum seeker (disambiguation)